701 Naval Air Squadron was a Royal Navy Fleet Air Arm squadron, formed on 24 May 1939, that saw service during the Second World War.

Formed on 15 July 1936 as No. 701 (Catapult) Flight FAA at RAF Kalafrana, Malta by re-designating No. 444 (Fleet Reconnaissance) Flight FAA; 701 Squadron saw action in the Norwegian campaign in mid-1940, and in May six Supermarine Walrus aircraft of the squadron were flown off  to support operations off Harstad.

By July 1943, the squadron was attached to No. 201 Group RAF for the invasion of Sicily (Operation Husky).

Aircraft operated
The squadron operated a variety of different aircraft and versions:
 Hawker Osprey
 Blackburn Shark
 Fairey Seal II
 Fairey Swordfish I/SP
 Supermarine Walrus
 Avro Anson C.X
 de Havilland Dominie I
 Beechcraft Expediter C.I & C.II
 North American Harvard III
 Airspeed Oxford
 Supermarine Seafire XV & XVII
 de Havilland Tiger Moth II
 Beechcraft Traveller I
 Westland Dragonfly HR.5
 Westland Whirlwind HAR.1, HAR.3 & HAS.7 & HAS.22

References

Citations

Bibliography

External links
 700-795 Naval Air Squadron Index

700 series Fleet Air Arm squadrons
Air squadrons of the Royal Navy in World War II